Animals is the third EP from American rock singer Ryan Star, it became available on August 5, 2013 via all digital music stores. The EP included five new songs, including the new single Impossible

Track listing

References

2013 EPs
Ryan Star albums